Castle of Deceit is a side-scrolling platform game for the Nintendo Entertainment System released in 1990 by Bunch Games. The player takes control of a wizard trapped in a castle with only one spell to defend himself.

Gameplay

Plot
Phfax, a mystic being, and wielder of the Emerald Magic, consented to offer his life to protect the stones of Rune. For centuries he dwelled within the plasma of energies of the stones where the Runes were hidden. Until at last it drove him insane. Such was the power of the stone that even the bitter hallucinations of his madness were given life. Six deadly beings appeared, stealing the Rune Stones. Cebo the most promising of the young Magicians of Dace, must enter the castle, exploring the realities. But do not trust your senses  what you see, what you hear may all be a lie.

Reception

References
Castle of Deceit at GameFAQs

1990 video games
Bunch Games games
Fantasy video games
Nintendo Entertainment System games
Nintendo Entertainment System-only games
North America-exclusive video games
Platform games
Unauthorized video games
Video games developed in the United States
Video games set in castles